Auburn Township is one of twenty townships in Fayette County, Iowa, USA.  As of the 2010 census, its population was 527.

Geography

Communities

Cities
 St. Lucas

Unincorporated communities
Auburn
Douglass at 
Massillon
West Auburn

Adjacent townships
Washington Township, Winneshiek County (north)
Dover Township (east)
Union Township (southeast)
Windsor Township (south)
Bethel Township (southwest)
Eden Township (west)
Jackson Township, Winneshiek County (northwest)

Cemeteries
The township contains these three cemeteries: Eden, Oak Ridge and Saint Lukes Catholic.

Major highways
  Iowa Highway 150

School districts
 North Fayette Valley Community School District
 Turkey Valley Community School District

Political districts
 Iowa's 1st congressional district
 State House District 18
 State Senate District 9

References
 United States Census Bureau 2008 TIGER/Line Shapefiles
 United States Board on Geographic Names (GNIS)
 United States National Atlas

External links
 US-Counties.com
 City-Data.com comprehensive statistical data

Townships in Fayette County, Iowa
Townships in Iowa